George Nicholls (born 14 May 1944) is an English former professional rugby league footballer who played in the 1970s and 1980s. A Great Britain and England international representative forward, he played his club rugby for English sides Widnes and St. Helens. Eventually becoming a St Helens R.F.C. Hall of Fame inductee, he also became the first player to win the Man of Steel Award, Harry Sunderland Trophy and Lance Todd Trophy with the club. With Great Britain, Nicholls also won the 1972 Rugby League World Cup.

Background
George Nicholls was born in Widnes, Lancashire, England.

Playing career

Widnes
Born in Widnes, Lancashire on 14 May 1944, George Nicholls commenced playing professionally for Rugby Football League club Widnes in 1966.

St Helens
The St Helens club acquired Nicholls' services in 1973 for £9,000. In the 1975–76 Challenge Cup Final Nicholls helped the St Helens side to victory.

In the 1978 Challenge Cup Final Nicholls was in the St Helens team which lost 14-12 to Leeds, but he won the Lance Todd Trophy. That year Nicholls was also voted the best player in the Championship, claiming the second-ever Man of Steel Award. The Open Rugby inaugural World XIII was revealed in June 1978 and included Nicholls. Nicholls played left- in the 7-13 defeat by Widnes in the 1978 BBC2 Floodlit Trophy Final at Knowsley Road, St. Helens on Tuesday 12 December 1978.

References

External links
George Nicholls biography at saints.org.uk
When Great Britain won the World Cup
Tracking down the heroes of 1972

1944 births
Living people
Cardiff City Blue Dragons players
England national rugby league team players
English rugby league players
Great Britain national rugby league team captains
Great Britain national rugby league team players
Lance Todd Trophy winners
Rugby league locks
Rugby league props
Rugby league players from Widnes
Rugby league second-rows
Salford Red Devils players
St Helens R.F.C. players
Widnes Vikings players